Survivals Football Club is a Lucian football club based in Mabouya Valley. The team plays in the SLFA First Division, the top tier of Saint Lucian football.

Survivals are the most recent champions of the SLFA First Division, winning the title during the 2016 season.

Honors 
SLFA First Division
Champions: (1) 2016

Shawn Edward Cup
Champions: (1) 2016

References 

Football clubs in Saint Lucia
Association football clubs established in 2010
2010 establishments in Saint Lucia